Noa Lindberg (Hebrew: נועה לינדברג; born April 25) is an American actor, writer, producer, director, and author of Israeli and European descent. As an Actress, she is best known for the Automated Selfie stick video, produced by Thinkmodo to promote TV Series UnReal Season 2 on Lifetime. The video went viral within hours and immediately reached millions of views and shares. It was featured on The Today Show on NBC, Fox Business, Teen Vogue, Los Angeles Magazine, On Air with Ryan Seacrest, CBS Los Angeles, In Style Magazine, FHM, and major TV networks and Magazines overseas, in Europe and all over Asia, such as M6 TV & Golem13 in France, De Telegraaf in the Netherlands, Israel Hayom in Israel, Zee News TV in India.
She is also known for her roles in Mi familia perfecta on Telemundo NBC Universal, Entourage the Movie, HBO movie Make Love Great Again, Selling Yachts on AWE TV, Amazon Prime movie Crocodylus, 20/20 on ABC, and Dr. Miami on We TV. 
 
As a Host, she is known for having her own interview show for iHeartRadio's Evolution 93.5. Artists she has interviewed include David Guetta, The Chainsmokers, Axwell & Ingrosso, Afrojack, Cheat Codes, Hardwell, Steve Aoki, Cash Cash, Craig David and Kygo.

As a Director, she's best known for having Directed Tekashi 69's music video Bebe featuring Anuel, as well as Logan Henderson, Madison Beer, and Lovelytheband, at the iHeartRadio's Y100 Miami Jingle Ball 2018.

As a Producer, she's known for a variety of ads and photoshoots for Puma with Rickie Fowler, Cobra Golf with Greg Norman and Lexi Thompson, and Bed Bath & Beyond products.

Noa Lindberg is the author of book Sneaky Sneakerton - The Sock That Got Away, a fun story solving the world-renowned mystery of socks disappearing from the wash, along with a heartwarming message of love, tolerance, diversity, inclusion, and unity. The book was published at Sumbunny Books, in October 2020.

Early life
Noa Lindberg was born in Israel and raised in Paris, France. She is the daughter of Henri, an architect, and Hanna a Six-Day War veteran. Noa attended Lycee Pasteur High School and Paris IX Dauphine University & Business School where she graduated with a Master's of Business Administration & Master's of International Business Law. Lindberg speaks English, French, Hebrew, German, and Spanish.

Filmography

Film

Television

Commercials

Music videos

External links

IMDb
Facebook
Twitter
Instagram
TikTok
Youtube
Telegram
Snapchat

References

Living people
Year of birth missing (living people)
Jewish American actresses
American people of Israeli descent
Place of birth missing (living people)
21st-century American Jews
21st-century American women